NPRT is an acronym that may refer to:

 National pharmacy response team
 Nauru Phosphate Royalties Trust
 National Pacific Radio Trust, a trust which owns and operates the Pacific Media Network